Rome (sometimes stylized as ROME) is the second studio album by American hip hop group Armand Hammer. It was released via Backwoodz Studioz in 2017.

Critical reception

Phillip Mlynar of Pitchfork gave the album an 8.1 out of 10, writing, "the two emcees have delved deeper and burrowed further into the leftfield, carving out a shadowy nook that not only shuns the commercial trappings of the mainstream but also moves on from the boom-bap theology that can plague these kinds of records." Paul Thompson of Vulture gave the album a favorable review, saying, "Rome, their newest record, is also their best, a master class in style and form, and a pointed look at the grand and tiny grasps for power people make every day, from private property seizures to nationalist Facebook rants." He added, "It's a record that fully utilizes each artist's greatest strengths, and stands up to any rap album released in 2017." Charles Aaron of City Pages described the album as "a grimly volatile, frightfully insightful spew of epic-poem proportions."

Tom Breihan of Stereogum placed it at number 28 on the "40 Best Rap Albums of 2017" list.

Track listing

References

External links
 
 

2017 albums
Armand Hammer (music group) albums
Albums produced by Kenny Segal
Albums produced by JPEGMafia